"We Can Make It" is a song by George Jones.  It was his first solo single with Epic Records in 1972 after leaving Musicor.

Background
"We Can Make It" was written by Glenn Sutton and Jones' new producer Billy Sherrill.  In the liner notes to the 1982 compilation Anniversary - 10 Years of Hits, Sherrill admits that they composed it with Jones's recent marriage to Tammy Wynette specifically in mind, providing the singer with  a song that seemed to be speaking to his wife.  Both Jones and Sherrill admitted in the 1990 Jones documentary Same Ole Me, they were both extremely nervous, with the latter commenting, "I was scared to death.  I was scared of him - he said he was scared of me."  Sherrill added that one modification he did make to Jones's style was having him sing in lower keys because he found the vocals on his early records "really, really high, and kind of annoying, to me." "We Can Make It," which made it to #6 on the charts, contained all the hallmarks of the Sherrill sound, including an ascending introduction and his countrypolitan "wall of sound," something Jones was not altogether comfortable with; in 2006 he recalled to Billboard, "He just came up with that sound like he got with Tammy, (singing) "Ba bum ba bum ba bum," build-ups...He tried to do that with me, but I finally had a talk with him. I said, 'Billy, I'm country, I'm traditional, I know you're wanting to cross over with me like you have with Tammy, Charlie Rich and those people, but I'm hardcore and I can't help it. That's what I feel, and I can't do a good job for the label, you or anybody else if I don't feel it myself.'"

Discography

1971 songs
Songs written by Glenn Sutton
Songs written by Billy Sherrill
Song recordings produced by Billy Sherrill
Epic Records singles
George Jones songs